Francisco Javier Illán Vivas (born in 1958 in Molina de Segura, Spain) is a writer and poet from Murcia.

Biography
Illán Vivas has almost always been related to the media world. He was widely known by his friends and family as Javier

Years ago, he was a correspondent for Diario de Murcia and for La Verdad de Murcia; currently he writes for the weekly digital publication Vegamediapress.com, where, in January 2006, he was named sub-director. He is in charge of producing the Culture and Literature section.

Style
His narrative is similar to the classic fantasy genre; very close to the adventure style of Robert E. Howard, but in the world of Mediterranean mythology. His short stories follow the style of H. P. Lovecraft. His poetry is focused on love songs.

Work

Poetry
 Con paso lento, Nausícäa Edición Electrónica, 2003.
 Dulce amargor, Edición del Ayuntamiento de Molina de Segura, 2005.

Narratives

External links
Official web site 

Spanish fantasy writers
Spanish novelists
Spanish male novelists
Spanish poets
Living people
1958 births
Murcian writers
Spanish male poets